Isoetaceae is a family including living quillworts (Isoetes) and comparable extinct herbaceous lycopsids (Tomiostrobus).

References

External links
 
 

Lycophytes
Plant families